Australembiidae is a family of webspinners in the order Embioptera. There is at least one genus, Metoligotoma, in the family Australembiidae.

References

Further reading

 
 
 
 

Embioptera
Insect families